The Honourable Thomas Townshend (2 June 1701 – 21 May 1780), of Frognal House, Kent,  was a British Whig politician who sat in the House of Commons for 52 years from 1722 to 1774.

Townshend was the second son of Charles Townshend, 2nd Viscount Townshend, and his first wife the Hon. Elizabeth Pelham. He was educated at Eton in 1718, and was admitted at King's College, Cambridge and Lincoln's Inn in 1720.

Townshend was returned as Whig Member of Parliament for Winchelsea at the 1722 British general election and was appointed under-secretary of state to his father in 1724. At the 1727 British general election, he was returned for  both Hastings and Cambridge University  and chose to represent Cambridge. He was appointed Teller of the Exchequer in 1727 and held the post for the rest of his life. In 1730 his father went out of office and Townshend lost his position as under-secretary. He was returned unopposed in 1741 and 1747.

Townshend was returned as MP for Cambridge University in 1754, 1761 and 1768. He was a regular attender in Parliament and made occasional speeches.

Townshend married Albinia Selwyn, daughter of John Selwyn, in 1730.  Albinia died in 1739. In 1752 Townshend  bought Frognal House, near Sidcup in Kent. He survived his wife by over 40 years and died in May 1780, aged 78. Their son Thomas became a prominent politician and was created Viscount Sydney in 1789. Townshend had brothers Charles, William and Roger, and nephews George, Charles and Charles Townshend, 1st Baron Bayning.

See also
Marquess Townshend

References

1701 births
1780 deaths
Alumni of King's College, Cambridge
British MPs 1722–1727
British MPs 1727–1734
British MPs 1734–1741
British MPs 1741–1747
British MPs 1747–1754
British MPs 1754–1761
British MPs 1761–1768
British MPs 1768–1774
Members of the Parliament of Great Britain for English constituencies
People educated at Eton College
Younger sons of viscounts
Thomas Townshend
Members of the Parliament of Great Britain for Cambridge University
Chief Secretaries for Ireland